La Chesnaye is a surname. Notable people with the surname include:

 Nicolas Filleul de La Chesnaye (1530–1575?), French poet and dramatist
 Charles Aubert de La Chesnaye (1632–1702), French financier active in Canada